Soft tennis is a racket game played on a court of two halves, separated by a net. Soft tennis originated in Japan in 1884. Like regular tennis, it is played by individuals (singles) or pairs (doubles), whose objective is to hit the ball over the net, landing within the confines of the court, with the aim of preventing one's opponent from being able to hit it back. Matches are generally best-of-seven or best-of-nine. Soft tennis differs from regular tennis in that it uses soft rubber balls instead of hard yellow balls.

It is played primarily in Asia, especially in Japan, Taiwan, South Korea, India, Thailand, and the Philippines. In 2004, soft tennis was introduced into Europe. Belgium, the Netherlands, Poland, Hungary, the Czech Republic and the United Kingdom all now have active soft tennis federations. All of them are also members of the European Soft Tennis Federation, and the International Federation JSTA.

History

Soft tennis originated in Japan in 1884. At the end of the 19th century, tennis was introduced to Japan by a Western missionary, and it was later modified to better suit Japanese tastes. Soft tennis was included in the 1990 Asian Games as an exhibition game and later became an official event in the 1994 Asian Games, It continues to be an official event at the Asian Games.

In 1955, the Asian Soft Tennis Federation was established by the three countries of Japan, South Korea and Taiwan. The Federation held the Asian Championships against the three countries from 1956 to 1973.
1970 Japan-US Soft Tennis Promotion Liaison Council is established. This is a liaison organization with the American school, and organized a friendly match between Japan and the United States for junior high school students.
In 1972, the Hawaii Soft Tennis Federation was established in Hawaii, United States. Held a state championship at the same time. Adopted as a regular physical education event at a public high school in Hawaii [Note 14].
Before and after the establishment of the Hawaii Soft Tennis Association, the Hong Kong Soft Tennis Association was established with the efforts of Taiwan (Republic of China Network Association). The Soft Tennis Association was also established in Venezuela, Brazil [1].
The first Japan-US High School Friendship Tournament was held in June 1974 [Note 15].
The International Federation of Soft Tennis Balls was established in 1974 [Note 16].
In 1975, the 1st World Soft Tennis Championships (currently the World Soft Tennis Championships) was held in Hawaii, USA, sponsored by the International Soft Tennis Federation and under the supervision of the Japan Soft Tennis Federation. [Note 17]
In 1977, the 2nd World Championship was held in Taichung City, Republic of China (Taiwan).
In the latter half of the 1970s, dissemination activities to Europe and the African continent (Zaire, etc.) began.
October 1978 The Scout Association of Japan [2] promotes activities on the west coast of the United States. This will be the first landing in the continental United States. Exhibitions and demonstrations mainly at high schools and universities
In 1979, the 3rd World Championship [3] was held in Daegu, South Korea.
In 1979, the national team traveled to the United States to demonstrate in California.
The promotion activities to Europe that started in the 1970s [Note 18] are still continuing mainly in Eastern Europe, the European Soft Tennis Federation has been established, and tournaments are held regularly in Hungary, Czech Republic, Poland, etc. [4].
In 1981, the 4th World Championship was held in Hilo, Hawaii, USA. The Japan Federation-led tournament was expected to be held in Japan for the first time, but it was abandoned due to the Taiwan issue, and it was held in Hawaii following the first tournament.
In December 1982, the 1st Asian Student Championship [Note 19] was held in Tainan City, Republic of China (Taiwan).
In 1983, the 5th World Championship was held in Taichung, Taichung, Taiwan. A Japanese boy loses to South Korea and surrenders the group title for the first time.
In November 1984, the 2nd Asian Student Championship was held in Daegu, South Korea.
In 1985, the World Championship was held for the first time in Japan (Aichi Prefectural Gymnasium, Nagoya City) (6th World Championship). In the boys, Taiwan won the group championship and won the best 4 in the individual competition.
Around this time, with the goal of entering the Asian Games event, dissemination activities to Asian countries other than South Korea and Taiwan are actively carried out.
In November 1986, the 3rd Asian Student Championship was held in Tokyo (Komazawa Gymnasium).
1986 An international convention is held in São Paulo, Brazil. Six countries from the United States (selected by Hawaii), Canada, the Dominican Republic, Paraguay, Japan, and Brazil participated.
In 1987, the 7th World Championship was held in Seoul, South Korea.
February 1988 Established by the Asian Soft Tennis Federation (ASTF) [Note 20]
1988 ASTF joins OCA (Olympic Council of Asia).
In 1988, the 1st Asian Soft Tennis Championships was held in Nagoya City [Note 21].
In 1989, the 8th World Championship was scheduled to be held in Taiwan, but it was canceled.
In 1990, the 11th Asian Games was held in Beijing. Soft tennis participates as a public event [Note 22].
In 1991, the 9th World Championship was held in Seoul, South Korea. It will be held every four years after this tournament.
In 1992, the 2nd Asian Soft Tennis Championships was held in Jakarta, Indonesia. Singles were introduced for the first time in this tournament (individual competition only).
In 1993, the 1st Southeast Asian Championship was held in Bangkok, Thailand.
In 1993, the 1st East Asian Games was held in Shanghai. Initially, soft tennis was not an event, but I hurriedly participated as an open event. Only team competitions were played. The competition method will be 3 doubles and 2 singles, which will be followed until the 2002 Asian Games.
In 1994, the 12th Asian Games (ASIAN GAMES) was held in Hiroshima City, and soft tennis participated for the first time as a formal competition [Note 23].
1995 10th World Championships held in Gifu (5th event [Note 24])
1996 3rd Asian Championship held in Bangkok, Thailand
1997 Participated in the 2nd East Asian Games (Busan) as a formal competition (group, doubles, singles).
1998 Participated in the 13th Asian Games (Bangkok) as a formal competition (group, doubles).
1999 11th World Championships held in Linkou, Taiwan (6 events other than mix)
2000 4th Asian Championships held in Saga (6th event other than mix)
Participated in the 3rd East Asian Games (Osaka) in 2001 as a formal competition (6 events other than the mix)
2002 Participated as a formal competition in the 14th Asian Games (Busan). Mixed doubles, men's singles, and women's singles have been added for a total of 7 events. After that, this will be inherited at various international competitions.
2003 The 12th World Championships are held in Hiroshima. Team battles are now 2 doubles and 1 singles. This will be followed thereafter. [Note 25] (7th event. Singles has become the current rule from this tournament)
2004 5th Asian Soft Tennis Championships held in Chiang Mai, Thailand (hard court, 7th event)
Participated in the 4th East Asian Games (Macau) in 2005 as a formal competition (hardcourt, sixth event excluding mix)
2006 Participated in the 15th Asian Games (Doha) as a formal competition (hardcourt, seventh event).
September 2007 The 13th World Championships are held in Anseong, South Korea. Participation from 42 countries and regions. It was the biggest tournament in history.
2008 6th Asian Soft Tennis Championships held in Mungyeong, South Korea (7th event)
In 2009, the INTERNATIONAL JUNIOR SOFT TENNIS TOURNAMENT [Note 27], which is an international tournament for youth by age [Note 26], started. The first convention was held in Yokkaichi City in December [Note 28]
The 5th East Asian Games was held in Hong Kong in 2009, but soft tennis is excluded from the competition
Participated in the 16th Asian Games (Guangzhou) as a formal competition in 2010 (7th event).
2011 The 14th World Championships are held in Mungyeong, South Korea.
Participated in the 2011 Southeast Asian Games [Note 29] as a formal competition (26th Southeast Asian Games SEA GAMES).
2012 7th Asian Soft Tennis Championships held in Chiayi, Taiwan (7th event)
Participated in the 2013 5th East Asian Games (Tianjin) as a formal competition (7th event)
Participated in the 17th Asian Games (Incheon) in 2014 as a formal competition (7th event).
In November 2014, the 2nd World Junior Championships [Note 30] was held in India.
2015 15th World Championships held in New Delhi, India (7th event).
2016 8th Asian Soft Tennis Championships Held in Soga (Chiba City) [Note 31]
Participated in the 2018 18th Asian Games (Jakarta / Palembang, Indonesia) as a formal competition [Note 32].
In November 2018, the 3rd World Junior Championships [Note 33] was held in Suncheon, South Korea.
The 1st East Asian Youth Games [Note 34] was scheduled to be held in Taichung, Taiwan in 2019, but it was canceled [Note 35].
In August 2019, the 1st Asian Junior Championships [Note 36] will be held in Quezon, Philippines.
In September 2019, the 1st Asian University Championship [Note 37] will be held in Quezon, Philippines.
In October 2019, the 16th World Championship will be held for the first time in mainland China (Taizhou City, Zhejiang Province).
Participated in the 2019 Southeast Asian Games as a formal competition (30th Southeast Asian Games SEA GAMES). Participation for the second time following the 26th tournament.
The 9th Asian Soft Tennis Championships in 2020 was scheduled to be held in Chiang Mai, Thailand, but it was postponed for one year due to the influence of the coronavirus [5].

Current situation in Japan
In the 1970s, it was said that "soft tennis is the most popular sport in middle and high school" [6]. Currently, there is a competitive population (registrants) of about 600,000 in Japan. The Japan Soft Tennis Federation estimates that there are about 7 million enthusiasts [7]. However, it is also a fact that the minor feeling is extremely strong in the consciousness of lovers in general. The causes are that it is not an Olympic event, that there have been no professional athletes in Japan for a long time [Note 38] [8], and that it is recognized that school physical education (junior high school, high school) is the main focus [Note 39]. ], The influence of tennis (rigid tennis, lawn tennis) [Note 40], which has rapidly become popular in Japan since the 1980s, is considered.

International Soft Tennis Federation
The International Soft Tennis Federation (ISTF) was established in 1973 and is the premier soft tennis governing body.

In 1970 the Japan-US Soft Tennis Promotion Liaison Council was established. This is a liaison organization with American schools, and organised a friendly match between Japan and the United States for junior high school students.

In 1972, the Hawaii Soft Tennis Federation was established in Hawaii, United States. A  state championship was held at the same time. Soft tennis was adopted as a regular PE event at a public high school in Hawaii.

Before and after the establishment of the Hawaii Soft Tennis Association, the Hong Kong Soft Tennis Association was established with the efforts of Taiwan (Republic of China Network Association). The Soft Tennis Association was also established in Venezuela and Brazil.

In June 1974 the first Japan-US High School Friendship Tournament was held.

Members
As of 2022 the ISTF had 60 members:
Asia:25
Oceania:2
Europe:21
America:11
Africa:1

Countries

Asian Soft Tennis Federation (ASTF)

Competition
Most of the rules for soft tennis are the same as those for regular tennis. When the rules were revised in 1992, singles became a formal event. This revision also enabled a forward player in doubles to serve. The serve plays an important role in a team's chances of winning.
The world championship was held every two years until 1987. Thereafter, the competition is held every four years. The following is a list of World Soft Tennis Championships and World Junior Soft Tennis Championships held by the International Soft Tennis Federation.

World Soft Tennis Championships

World Junior Soft Tennis Championships

Court dimensions

References

External links

International Soft Tennis Federation
 Soft Tennis homepage

 
Individual sports
Ball games
Racket sports
Forms of tennis
Sports originating in Japan